There Must Be Somebody Else is a 1927 American popular song written by Maceo Pinkard, Archie Gottler and Sidney Clare. It is considered a jazz standard and has been recorded many times.

The song was a hit when first published, and was covered by numerous artists including Ben Bernie and His Hotel Roosevelt Orchestra, Annette Hanshaw, Ben Selvin & His Orchestra and Belle Baker. It was also featured in a Vitaphone short film, Stories in Song (1927) as one of four songs performed by Adele Rowland. The song was part of Louis Armstrong's repertoire. Barbara Rosene included the song as a track in the 2007 album It Was Only a Sun Shower.

See also
 List of 1920s jazz standards

External links
 

1927 songs
1920s jazz standards
Belle Baker songs
Louis Armstrong songs
Songs with lyrics by Sidney Clare
Songs with music by Maceo Pinkard
Songs written by Archie Gottler